Cora caliginosa is a species of basidiolichen in the family Hygrophoraceae. Found in Peru, it was formally described as a new species in 2016 by María Holgado-Rojas, Eimy Rivas-Plata, and Gary Perlmutter. The specific epithet, which derives from the Latin caliginosus ("dull, somber, cloudy"), alludes to the colour of fresh specimens. It is only known to occur near the type locality near Machu Picchu, where it grows on the ground close to a disturbed rainforest.

References

caliginosa
Lichen species
Lichens described in 2016
Lichens of Peru
Basidiolichens